Rise of Industry is a business tycoon game, developed by Spanish indie team Dapper Penguin Studios and published by Kasedo Games. The game sees players build and manage their industrial empire as they attempt to grow and expand in the early 20th century.

The game was released to early access on February 9, 2018, primarily through Steam and GOG until it was released as a full release on May 2, 2019. The Rise of Industry IP was sold to an unknown buyer in early 2022.

Gameplay 
In Rise of Industry, players begin with a sum of money and a map on which to build which is shared with several AI controlled towns and villages. It is your aim as the player to build an industrial empire by supplying these towns and villages with the products they demand.

There are currently two main game modes, Career and Sandbox. In career mode, the player must choose a specialism in which to begin their empire. There are four specialisms to choose from: Gathering, Farming, Industry and Logistics. While all remain open for the player to use, the chosen specialism will grant more Research & Development points, which are used to upgrade in the tech tree. In Sandbox mode, all unlocks are available and the player can build without research and financial limitations.

A game is played on a map which is broken up into regions, each requiring the player to buy a permit in order to build within that region. There are two permit types; a full build permit which enables you to build anything within that region and a logistical permit which will allow the placement of network elements such as railway tracks and roads but not buildings. The player can then start to place buildings such as factories, farms, gatherers etc. and then sell products to towns and villages requiring them. The price paid for your products is set by a global supply and demand system. The more of a product that is available, the less money you will receive, however towns will pay a premium for good that aren't as plentiful. The towns won't just rely on the player to get produce though. They will look to either produce a demanded item themselves, or look for a trade connection with neighbouring towns.

Trade routes play a large part in the game as a function to move your products from A to B. The player can create a trade route for a variety of transport including trucks, boats, trains and zeppelins with each mode of transport having an advantage over another depending on the distance and capacity needed for each route.

Development 
The game was originally named Project Automata in early development. Its name was changed to Rise of Industry in early 2017.

Rise of Industry was released as a pre-alpha version on indie video game store, itch.io in order to gain player feedback in order to improve gameplay before the official early access release. During this time, Rise of Industry became the most purchased game of 2017 on Itch.

Reception 

Rock Paper Shotgun said that Rise of Industrys early access release was "full of neat ideas" but that "they might wait until further updates to play again". PC Gamer called it a "fairly deep sim", although they thought that the lack of flexibility in the game "could put people off". Hardcore Gamer however praised Dapper Penguin Studios for "their total openness to their community" and "great willingness to listen to player feedback", stating "this is exactly how an Early Access release should be handled".

References

External links 

2019 video games
Business simulation games
Early access video games
Indie video games
Kasedo Games games
Linux games
MacOS games
Single-player video games
Video games developed in Spain
Windows games